Zhou Lijun (born 1 January 1999) is a Chinese taekwondo athlete. She won the gold medal at the 2018 Asian Taekwondo Championships on the women's featherweight's. Later, she won the 2018 World Taekwondo Grand Slam defeating the olympic champion Jade Jones on the grand final of the women's featherweight's.

References 

Chinese female taekwondo practitioners
Living people
1999 births
World Taekwondo Championships medalists
Taekwondo practitioners at the 2020 Summer Olympics
Olympic taekwondo practitioners of China
21st-century Chinese women